Zatrephes is a genus of moths in the family Erebidae. The genus was erected by Jacob Hübner in 1819. It was formerly considered part of the Arctiidae. It includes the former genus Ennomomima, which is now considered a synonym.

Species
With the synonymisation of Ennomomima, Zatrephes comprises the following species:

 Zatrephes afenestrata Toulgoët, 1987
 Zatrephes albescens Rothschild, 1909
 Zatrephes amoena Dognin, 1924
 Zatrephes arenosa Schaus, 1905
 Zatrephes atrata Rothschild, 1910
 Zatrephes bicolorata (H. Druce, 1906)
 Zatrephes bilineata Rothschild, 1909
 Zatrephes binotata Rothschild, 1909
 Zatrephes brunnea Rothschild, 1909
 Zatrephes carmesina Rothschild, 1909
 Zatrephes cardytera Dyar, 1910
 Zatrephes crocos (Cramer, [1777])
 Zatrephes cruciata Rothschild, 1909
 Zatrephes dichroma Toulgoët, [1990]
 Zatrephes dithyris Hampson, 1905
 Zatrephes duraneli (Toulgoët, 1991)
 Zatrephes elegans Toulgoët, 1987
 Zatrephes fallax Dognin, 1923
 Zatrephes fasciola Seitz, 1922
 Zatrephes flavida Hampson, 1905
 Zatrephes flavipuncta Rothschild, 1909
 Zatrephes foliacea Rothschild, 1909
 Zatrephes funebris Toulgoët, 1987
 Zatrephes gigantea Rothschild, 1909
 Zatrephes griseorufa Rothschild, 1909
 Zatrephes haxairei Toulgoët, [1990]
 Zatrephes iridescens Rothschild, 1910
 Zatrephes irrorata Rothschild, 1909
 Zatrephes klagesi Rothschild, 1909
 Zatrephes krugeri Reich, 1934
 Zatrephes lentiginosus Rothschild, 1917
 Zatrephes magnifenestra Bryk, 1953
 Zatrephes marmorata Toulgoët, 1987
 Zatrephes miniata Rothschild, 1909
 Zatrephes mirabilis (Toulgoët, [1990])
 Zatrephes modesta Schaus, 1905
 Zatrephes mossi Rothschild, 1933
 Zatrephes nitida (Cramer, [1780])
 Zatrephes novicia Schaus, 1921
 Zatrephes ockendeni Rothschild, 1909
 Zatrephes olivenca Dognin, 1923
 Zatrephes ossea Schaus, 1905
 Zatrephes propinqua Rothschild, 1909
 Zatrephes rosacea Rothschild, 1909
 Zatrephes rosella Rothschild, 1917
 Zatrephes rufescens Rothschild, 1909
 Zatrephes subflavescens Rothschild, 1909
 Zatrephes toulgoetana (Laguerre, 2005)
 Zatrephes trailii Butler, 1877
 Zatrephes trilineata Hampson, 1905
 Zatrephes varicolor Toulgoët, 1987
 Zatrephes variegata Rothschild, 1909

Former species
 Zatrephes flavonotata Rothschild, 1909, now Epimolis flavonotata.
 Zatrephes ignota Schaus, 1921, synonym of Zatrephes cardytera.
 Zatrephes pseudopraemolis Rothschild, 1909, now Epimolis pseudopraemolis.

References

Phaegopterina
Moth genera